Ballets is an album by soprano saxophonist Steve Lacy which was recorded live in Switzerland in 1980 and in the studio in Paris in 1981 and first released on the hat ART label as a double LP.

Track listing
All compositions by Steve Lacy
 "Hedges / Squirrel / Fox I" – 18:15
 "Fox II / Rabbit / Shambles" – 19:40
 "The 4 Edges: Outline" – 12:45
 "The 4 Edges: Underline" – 6:35
 "The 4 Edges: Coastline" – 9:55
 "The 4 Edges: Deadline" – 11:20

Personnel
Steve Lacy – soprano saxophone, bells, gong, voice
Steve Potts – alto saxophone, soprano saxophone (tracks 3-6)
Bobby Few – piano, Fender Rhodes piano (tracks 3-6)
Irene Aebi – cello, violin, voice (tracks 3-6) 
Jean-Jacques Avenel – bass (tracks 3-6) 
Oliver Johnson – drums (tracks 3-6)

References

Steve Lacy (saxophonist) albums
1982 albums
Hathut Records albums